Marcel Kint (20 September 1914, in Zwevegem – 23 March 2002, in Kortrijk) was a Belgian professional road bicycle racer who won 31 races between 1935 and 1951. His finest year was 1938 when he won the World Cycling Championship, three stages of the Tour de France and the season-long competition equivalent to today's UCI ProTour.

He specialized in one-day classic cycle races and won Paris–Roubaix, Gent–Wevelgem, Paris–Brussels. He was the only three-time consecutive winner of La Flèche Wallonne until 2016 when Alejandro Valverde won his third consecutive race and fourth overall.

Major results

1933
 1st  Junior National Road Race Championships
1935
 1st Kampioenschap van Vlaanderen
 1st Stage 7 Tour de Luxembourg
1936
 1st Antwerpen–Gent–Antwerpen
 1st Stage 2 Tour of Belgium
 4th Overall Paris–Nice
 9th Overall Tour de France
1st Stage 19
1937
 1st Gent–Ieper
 2nd La Flèche Wallonne
 2nd Paris–Lille
 6th Paris–Brussels
 10th Overall Paris–Nice
1938
 1st  Road race, World Road Championships
 1st Paris–Brussels
 1st GP d'Espéraza
 2nd Liège–Bastogne–Liège
 3rd Tour of Flanders
 3rd National Road Race Championships
 7th Paris–Tours
 9th Overall Tour de France
1st Stages 15, 16 & 18
1939
 1st Antwerpen–Gent–Antwerpen
 1st Stages 8A & 18B Tour de France
 1st  National Road Race Championships
 1st GP Stad Zottegem
 2nd Paris–Roubaix
 5th Paris–Brussels
 5th Bordeaux–Paris
1943
 1st La Flèche Wallonne
 1st Paris–Roubaix
 1st Ronde van Limburg
 5th Tour of Flanders
 8th Paris–Tours
1944
 1st La Flèche Wallonne
 1st Grand Prix Jules Lowie
 9th Tour of Flanders
1945
 1st La Flèche Wallonne
 1st Omloop der Vlaamse Ardennen Ichtegem
1946
 2nd Road race, World Road Championships
 9th Tour of Flanders
 10th Paris–Roubaix
1949
 1st Gent–Wevelgem
 4th Kuurne–Brussels–Kuurne
1950
 8th Overall Roma–Napoli–Roma
 10th Paris–Roubaix
1951
 1st Elfstedenronde
 7th La Flèche Wallonne
 9th Liège–Bastogne–Liège

References

External links 

Official Tour de France results for Marcel Kint

1914 births
2002 deaths
Belgian male cyclists
Belgian Tour de France stage winners
UCI Road World Champions (elite men)
People from Zwevegem
Cyclists from West Flanders